Senator Lynch may refer to:

Members of the Northern Irish Senate
Louis Lynch (1904–1976), Northern Irish Senator from 1949 to 1957
Thaddeus Lynch (Northern Ireland politician) (1882–?), Northern Irish Senator from 1941 to 1949

United States state senate members
Ann Lynch (born 1964), Minnesota State Senate
Charles Lynch (judge) (1736–1796), Virginia State Senate
Charles Lynch (politician) (1783–1853), Mississippi State Senate
Erin Lynch Prata (born 1975), Rhode Island State Senate
Francis Lynch (1920–1993), Pennsylvania State Senate
J. D. Lynch (born 1947), Montana State Senate
John A. Lynch Jr. (born 1938), New Jersey State Senate
John A. Lynch Sr. (1908–1978), New Jersey State Senate
Neil Lynch (politician) (born 1934), Montana State Senate
Stephen F. Lynch (born 1955), Massachusetts State Senate
William Joseph Lynch (1908–1976), Illinois State Senate